A house committee is a type of committee existing in several legislatures. It may refer to

 House Committee (Malaysian House of Representatives)
 House Committee (Malaysian Senate)
 House Committee (Parliament of the United Kingdom)
 House Committee (United States House of Representatives)